Czesław Niemen (February 16, 1939 – January 17, 2004), born Czesław Juliusz Wydrzycki, and often credited as just Niemen, was one of the most important and original Polish singer-songwriters and rock balladeers of the 20th century, singing mainly in Polish.

Biography

Early life
Niemen was born in Stare Wasiliszki in the Nowogródek Voivodeship of the Second Polish Republic (now in the Grodno Region of Belarus). Czesław Niemen belonged to a community of Belarusians and Poles, living outside the eastern borders of contemporary Poland, on the eastern lands of the historical Polish–Lithuanian Commonwealth (called 'Kresy' – 'borderlands' – in Polish). Czesław Niemen studied in Grodno at "State college.

In the dawn of World War II these ethnic Polish lands were annexed by the Soviet Union, when Poland was split due to the Molotov-Ribbentrop pact, and became a part of the Belorussian SSR, which was affirmed by Europe's post-war reorganization performed during the Yalta Conference.

1960s
He made his debut in the early 1960s, singing Polish rock and soul music. He possessed an unusually wide voice range and equally rich intonation. He was also an ardent composer and a keyboard player.

In 1964 at Congress Hall, Warsaw, Niemen, together with his group, played as a support act to Marlene Dietrich during her concert. She heard his song "Czy mnie jeszcze pamiętasz" ("Do you still remember me?") there. She enjoyed it so much that she soon wrote her own lyrics for the song and recorded "Mutter, Hast du Mir Vergeben" ("Mother, have you forgiven me?").

Soon after his first successful concerts in France, he started to use the pseudonym Niemen instead of his real name, gaining wider notoriety in Poland and making it easier to pronounce by foreigners (Niemen is a Polish pronunciation of the Neman River, which flows in close proximity to his place of birth). His 1967 song "Dziwny jest ten świat" (Strange Is This World) is commonly acknowledged to be the most important Polish protest song of that era; an English version was also recorded in 1972. The song was influenced by the American blues tradition.  He was one of the first Polish performers to wear long hair and colourful clothes and introduced the style of psychedelia to communist Poland, which displeased officials.

The first three LP album's Niemen recorded with his band "Akwarele" (Watercolours). Subsequently, he recorded with his other new bands: "Enigmatic", "Grupa Niemen" and "Aerolit". In 1969 he changed his musical style to progressive rock while recording the monumental album Enigmatic. That album's most notable song was "Bema pamięci żałobny rapsod" (A Mournful Rhapsody in Memory of Józef Bem), based on the 19th-century poem by Cyprian Kamil Norwid. The rest of Enigmatic'''s songs were also in sung poetry form. Niemen played the Hammond organ on his records, later moving to the mellotron and the Moog synthesizer.

1970s
In the early 1970s, Niemen recorded three English language albums under the CBS label, two of them (and three more in Poland) with the Silesian band SBB. With SBB Niemen performed at the Rock & Jazz Now! opening show for the 1972 Summer Olympics in Munich sharing the stage with Mahavishnu Orchestra, John McLaughlin and Charles Mingus and subsequently toured with Jack Bruce's band. In 1972 he also performed a song he wrote in Andrzej Wajda's film Wesele (The Wedding). In 1974 he recorded Mourner's Rhapsody with Jan Hammer and Rick Laird from Mahavishnu Orchestra. In the seventies, Niemen turned to jazz-rock fusion and electronic music, recording the album Katharsis.

Later years and death
Niemen went on to compose film soundtracks and theater music, and in the 1990s he showed interest in art, painting and computer graphics.

He died of cancer on January 17, 2004, in Warsaw. His remains were cremated and placed in a columbarium niche on Powązki Cemetery in Warsaw on January 30, 2004.

Awards and recognitions
Niemen won the Sopot International Song Festival in 1979.

Remembrance

A number of documentaries on the life of Niemen were filmed including Marek Piwowski's 1968 film Sukces, Krzysztof Rogulski's 1976 film Niemen, Eugeniusz Szpakowski's 2007 film Czesław Niemen, and Krzysztof Magowski's 2014 film Sen o Warszawie (A Dream About Warsaw).

Since March 12, 2004, Czesław Niemen's song Sen o Warszawie'' has been performed before each match of Legia Warsaw at the Stadion Wojska Polskiego and is considered the club fans' anthem.

In 2009, National Bank of Poland presented three coins dedicated to Niemen: issued on June 19 two silver 10-zloty coins, one of which of square shape, and issued on June 17, 2-zloty coin of Nordic Gold alloy.

On February 20, 2011, a museum devoted to Niemen and his musical legacy was opened in the artist's birthplace in Stare Wasiliszki, present-day Belarus.

Niemen's support bands
Niemen cooperated with the following bands; some of them were support musicians, while others were independent bands: "Akwarele" ("Watercolours") (1967–1969), "I Niemen" ("And Niemen") (1969–1970), also under the name "Niemen Enigmatic"), "Grupa Niemen" (made of the members of Silesian Blues Band), Niebiesko-Czarni, "Aerolit", and female vocal band Alibabki. "Aerolit"  accompanied Czesław Niemen in 1974–1978. Initially it was formed from young musicians of the rock band Krzak: Jacek Gazda, Jan Błędowski, Maciej Radziejewski, Piotr Dziemski. The word means "aerolite" in Polish.

Discography

Studio albums

English-language albums

Russian-language albums

Live albums

Compilation albums

Further reading
 Roman Radoszewski, Czesław Niemen: Kiedy się dziwić przestanę. Monografia artystyczna. Iskry, 2004. .
 Marek Gaszyński, Czas jak rzeka. Prószyński i S-ka, 2004. .
 Dariusz Michalski, Niemen o sobie. Warszawa: Twój Styl, 2005. .
 Tadeusz Skliński, Niemen: dyskografia, fakty, twórczość. Nemunas, 2006. .
 Dariusz Michalski, Czesław Niemen: Czy go jeszcze pamiętasz?. Warszawa: MG, 2009. .
 Jan Edward Czachor, Czesław Niemen w Świebodzinie. Stowarzyszenie Pamięci Czesława Niemena w Świebodzinie, 2010.

References

External links

Czesław Niemen at ProgArchives.com – photographs, reviews, music, discography
 Niemen, partial dyscography incl. singles
Forum
Czesław Niemen at culture.pl
 Did James Brown Inspire the Beat Generation in Poland?

1939 births
2004 deaths
People from Shchuchyn District
People from Nowogródek Voivodeship (1919–1939)
Sopot International Song Festival winners
Polish keyboardists
Sung poetry of Poland
Polish people of Belarusian descent
Soviet emigrants to Poland
Polish pop singers
Polish rock singers
English-language singers from Poland
20th-century Polish male singers
Deaths from cancer in Poland
Recipient of the Meritorious Activist of Culture badge